Anti-phishing software consists of computer programs that attempt to identify phishing content contained in websites, e-mail, or other forms used to accessing data (usually from the internet) and block the content, usually with a warning to the user (and often an option to view the content regardless). It is often integrated with web browsers and email clients as a toolbar that displays the real domain name for the website the viewer is visiting, in an attempt to prevent fraudulent websites from masquerading as other legitimate websites.

Most popular web browsers comes with built-in anti-phishing and anti-malware protection services, but almost none of the alternate web browsers have such protections.

Password managers can also be used to help defend against phishing, as can some mutual authentication techniques.

Notable client-based anti-phishing programs

avast!
Avira Premium Security Suite
Earthlink ScamBlocker (discontinued)
eBay Toolbar
Egress Defend 
ESET Smart Security
G Data Software G DATA Antivirus
GeoTrust TrustWatch
Google Safe Browsing (used in Mozilla Firefox, Google Chrome, Opera, Safari, and Vivaldi)
Kaspersky Internet Security
McAfee SiteAdvisor
Microsoft SmartScreen (used in Microsoft Edge, Internet Explorer, and Microsoft Outlook)
Mozilla Thunderbird
Netcraft Toolbar
Netscape
Norton 360
Norton Internet Security
PhishTank SiteChecker
Quick Heal
Windows Mail - default Windows Vista e-mail client
WOT (Web Of Trust) - browser extension
ZoneAlarm

Service-based anti-phishing

 Google Safe Browsing
 OpenDNS
 PhishTank

Anti-phishing effectiveness
An independent study conducted by Carnegie Mellon University CyLab titled "Phinding Phish: An Evaluation of Anti-Phishing Toolbars" and released November 13, 2006 tested the ability of ten anti-phishing solutions to block or warn about known phishing sites and not block or warn about legitimate sites (not exhibit false-positives), as well as the usability of each solution. Of the solutions tested, Netcraft Toolbar, EarthLink ScamBlocker and SpoofGuard were able to correctly identify over 75% of the sites tested, with Netcraft Toolbar receiving the highest score without incorrectly identifying legitimate sites as phishing. Severe problems were however discovered using SpoofGuard, and it incorrectly identified 38% of the tested legitimate sites as phishing, leading to the conclusion that "such inaccuracies might nullify the benefits SpoofGuard offers in identifying phishing sites." Google Safe Browsing (which has since been built into Firefox) and Internet Explorer both performed well, but when testing ability to detect fresh phishes Netcraft Toolbar scored as high as 96%, while Google Safe Browsing scored as low as 0%, possibly due to technical problems with Google Safe Browsing. The testing was performed using phishing data obtained from Anti-Phishing Working Group, PhishTank, and an unnamed email filtering vendor.

Another study, conducted by SmartWare for Mozilla and released November 14, 2006, concluded that the anti-phishing filter in Firefox was more effective than Internet Explorer by over 10%. The results of this study have been questioned by critics, noting that the testing data was sourced exclusively from PhishTank, which itself is an anti-phishing provider. The study only compared Internet Explorer and Firefox, leaving out (among others) Netcraft Toolbar and the Opera browser, both of which use data from PhishTank in their anti-phishing solutions. This has led to speculations that, with the limited testing data, both Opera and Netcraft Toolbar would have gotten a perfect score had they been part of the study.

While the two directly aforementioned reports were released only one day apart, Asa Dotzler, Director of Community Development at Mozilla, has responded to the criticism of the Mozilla-commissioned report by saying, "so you're agreeing that the most recent legitimate data puts Firefox ahead. Good enough for me."

Since these studies were conducted, both Microsoft and Opera Software have started licensing Netcraft's anti-phishing data, bringing the effectiveness of their browser's built-in anti-phishing on par with Netcraft Toolbar and beyond.

See also
Mutual authentication
Two-factor authentication - note: almost all two-factor techniques are also susceptible to phishing.

References

External links
 

Computer security software